José de Amézola y Aspizua (9 January 1874 – 1922) was a Spanish Basque pelotari who competed at the 1900 Summer Olympics in Paris, France.

Amezola entered in the only official pelota contest in Olympic history, the Basque pelota at the 1900 Summer Olympics two-man teams event. He and his partner Francisco Villota defeated the French team, Maurice Durquetty and Etchegaray, by default (walkover). This was Spain's first ever Olympic Medal.

See also
 List of Basques

References

Sources
 De Wael, Herman. Herman's Full Olympians: "Pelota 1900". Accessed 25 February 2006.
 
 Arrechea, Fernando. http://olimpismo2007.blogspot.com

External links
 

Pelotaris at the 1900 Summer Olympics
Olympic pelotaris of Spain
Olympic gold medalists for Spain
Sportspeople from Álava
Spanish pelotaris
1874 births
1922 deaths
Medalists at the 1900 Summer Olympics
Pelotaris from the Basque Country (autonomous community)